5G-Tronic is Mercedes-Benz's trademark name for its five-speed automatic transmission, starting off with the W5A 580 and W5A 330 (Wandler-5-Gang-Automatik bis 580 oder 330 Nm Eingangsdrehmoment; converter-5-gear-automatic with 428 or 243 ft·lb maximum input torque; type 722.6) as core models.

Abstract

The 5G-Tronic (model W5A 330 and W5A 580 · type 722.6) is an electronically shifted 5-speed overdrive automatic transmission with torque converter lock-up (typically in gears 3, 4 and 5) and 2-speed for reverse. In all applications this transmission is identified as the New Automatic Gearbox Generation One, or NAG1.

It replaced the older 4-speed 4G-Tronic transmission-family and its 5-speed derivative, and was replaced by the significantly more complex and cost-intensive 7-speed Mercedes-Benz 7G-Tronic (model W7A 700 · type 722.9) transmission with 11 main components, introduced in 2003. Due to its high torque capacity (up to 1000 Nm) and lower cost, it was still retained for turbocharged V12 engines, four-cylinder applications and commercial vehicles for almost a decade. It is still being built for niche applications (e.g. Sprinter with petrol/CNG M111 engine, Jeep Wrangler, etc.).

Specifications

Basic concept
Technical and economic progress is reflected in 5 forward gears out of 9 main components, compared to 5 forward gears out of 11 main components in the direct predecessor. It is fully electronically controlled and equipped with a torque converter lock-up.

Gear ratios

Special operating modes

Winter/Summer (Standard) Mode
Activated by a toggle switch, Winter mode sets the gearbox to start off in 2nd gear, both in Drive and Reverse. This is designed to reduce wheelspin on icy surfaces. Also in "W" mode the transmission will shift at lower speeds. "S" mode is not sport but Sommer (German for summer) or Standard.

With Jaguar XJR applications the switch is labelled "Sport".  In regular driving mode the gearbox starts off in 2nd gear, both in Drive and Reverse, and will only engage 1st gear when triggered via the kickdown switch (Drive only).  While "Sport" mode is enabled the gearbox will always start off in 1st gear.

Speedshift (2001-)
Speedshift is a performance feature set for the Mercedes-Benz transmissions which includes manual mode and active downshifting. When cornering at high speed, the transmission maintains the same gear above a certain lateral acceleration level. It can also automatically downshift before overtaking.

It was first used in 2001 Mercedes-Benz C 32 AMG and 2001 Mercedes-Benz SLK 32 AMG.

AMG Speedshift (2002-)
A version with mechanical lock-up of the torque converter from first gear and steering-wheel-mounted shifter. AMG Speedshift is also used in 7G-Tronic transmission.

It was first used in 2002 Mercedes-Benz E 55 AMG, S 55 AMG, C55, CL 55 AMG.

AMG Speedshift R
A version used in Mercedes-Benz SLR McLaren. It includes three manual modes.

Applications

Mercedes models

Mercedes S-Class

1996–1998 Mercedes-Benz W140
1999–2005 Mercedes-Benz W220
2006–2013 Mercedes-Benz W221 (V12 models only)

Mercedes CL
1996–1998 Mercedes-Benz C140
2000–2006 Mercedes-Benz C215
2007–2014 Mercedes-Benz C216 (V12 Models only)

Mercedes CLS
2004-2006 Mercedes-Benz W219

Mercedes E-Class
1996–2002 Mercedes-Benz W210 (all models except some early 1996 cars)
2002–2006 Mercedes-Benz W211 (all models except 2004-2006 RWD E500)
2007–2009 Mercedes-Benz W211 (4-cyl and 4-matic only)
2009–2011 Mercedes-Benz W212 (4-cyl models only)

Mercedes C-Class
1996–2000 Mercedes-Benz W202
2001–2005 Mercedes-Benz W203 (all models)
2006–2007 Mercedes-Benz W203 (4-cyl and 4-matic models only)
2007–2011 Mercedes-Benz W204 (4-cyl models only)

Mercedes CLK
1998–2002 Mercedes-Benz W208
2003–2005 Mercedes-Benz W209 (all models except 2005 CLK 500)
2006–2009 Mercedes-Benz W209 (4-cyl and CLK 55AMG only)

Mercedes ML
1998–2005 Mercedes-Benz W163

Mercedes G-Class
1996–2006 Mercedes-Benz W463 (all models)
2007–2012 Mercedes-Benz W463 (G55 AMG only)

Mercedes SLK
1997–2003 Mercedes-Benz R170
2004–2010 Mercedes-Benz R171 (4-cyl models only)

Mercedes SL

1996–2001 Mercedes-Benz R129
2001–2004 Mercedes-Benz R230 (all models)
2005–2006 Mercedes-Benz R230 (all models except SL500)
2007–2011 Mercedes-Benz R230 (SL 55AMG and V12 models only)

Mercedes SLR
2005–2009 Mercedes-Benz W199

Maybach
2002–2013 Maybach 57 and 62

Non Mercedes-Benz models

Jeep
2002–2013 Jeep Grand Cherokee (02-04 WG Diesel W5J400, 05-10 WK V6, WK 6.1 SRT V8, WH V6 3.0 Diesel export only Steyr W5A580)
2006–2010 Jeep Commander XK (3.7 gas) XH (3.0 diesel - export)
2012–2016 Jeep Wrangler (JK)
Jeep Liberty (KK) (W5A580)

Dodge
2005–2008 Dodge Magnum (AWD, RT, SRT8 only)
2006–2014 Dodge Charger (2006-14 R/T, SRT8; 5.7, 6.1L, & 6.4) (2006-2007 3.5L V6 HO) 
2006-2020 Dodge Charger Pursuit
2007–2011 Dodge Nitro (4.0L and 2,8 diesel)
2009–2014 Dodge Challenger
2011–2012 Dodge Durango (V6 Models only)
2003–2006 Dodge Sprinter Vans ( N. America)

Chrysler
2004–2008 Chrysler Crossfire, all models
2005–2014 Chrysler 300

Lancia
2011-2014 Lancia Thema

Jaguar
1998–2003 Jaguar X308 (Supercharged models only)
1998–2002 Jaguar XK (X100) (Supercharged models only)

SsangYong
1997–2014 SsangYong Chairman H
2001–2017 SsangYong Rexton
2004–2019 SsangYong Rodius
2005–2014 SsangYong Kyron
2014–2018 SsangYong Actyon

Porsche
1997–2006 Porsche 911

Freightliner
2001-2007 Freightliner Sprinter Vans (USA)

See also

 List of Daimler AG transmissions

Notes

References

External links
WK Transmissions
ATT24 GmbH
db automobile GmbH
5